Frithjof Lorentzen (7 September 1896 – 13 July 1965) was a Norwegian épée and foil fencer. He competed at the 1924 and 1928 Summer Olympics.

References

External links
 

1896 births
1965 deaths
Norwegian male épée fencers
Olympic fencers of Norway
Fencers at the 1924 Summer Olympics
Fencers at the 1928 Summer Olympics
Sportspeople from Newcastle, New South Wales
Norwegian male foil fencers
20th-century Norwegian people